Henry Cullen Adams (November 28, 1850 – July 9, 1906) was an American farmer, public administrator, and U.S. Congressman from Wisconsin, best known for his support of pure food laws.

Biography
Adams was born in Verona, New York to Hamilton College professor Benjamin Franklin Adams and Caroline Shepard, but moved to his father's farm in Jefferson County, Wisconsin, when he was an infant. The family moved again a few years later to southeastern Dane County, Wisconsin. His father was elected to the Wisconsin State Assembly for that area and served in the Assembly in 1862 and 1872.

Adams attended Albion Academy and then the University of Wisconsin–Madison, but withdrew for health reasons before earning a degree.  After marrying Anne Burkley Norton in 1878, he operated a successful dairy and fruit farm and served as president of the Wisconsin Dairymen's Association.  He was elected to the Wisconsin State Assembly in 1882, representing the same geographic area that his father had represented, though the districts had been reapportioned. He was re-elected in 1883 and in 1884—the first year that Assemblymembers were elected to two-year terms.  He left office in 1887 and became a member of the Wisconsin Board of Agriculture (1887–95).  He also held the offices of Wisconsin Superintendent of Public Property (1889–91) and Food and Dairy Commissioner (1898-1902).

In 1902, Adams was elected to the United States House of Representatives from Wisconsin's 2nd congressional district. He served in the 58th United States Congress and was reelected to the 59th Congress serving until his death (March 4, 1903 - July 9, 1906).  He was a progressive Republican and supporter of Robert M. "Fighting Bob" La Follette.  In Congress, he worked for passage of the Federal Meat Inspection Act and the Pure Food and Drug Act.  He died of intestinal illness in 1906 in Chicago, while en route from Washington, D.C., to his home in Wisconsin.  He is buried in Madison, Wisconsin.

See also
List of United States Congress members who died in office (1900–49)

References

Sources

American National Biography, vol. 1, p. 93.
 Wisconsin Historical Society biography

Henry Cullen Adams, late a representative from Wisconsin, Memorial addresses delivered in the House of Representatives and Senate frontispiece 1907

1850 births
1906 deaths
People from Verona, New York
Republican Party members of the Wisconsin State Assembly
Farmers from Wisconsin
University of Wisconsin–Madison alumni
Republican Party members of the United States House of Representatives from Wisconsin
19th-century American politicians